Paul Vighals (31 March 1886 – 1 September 1962) was a Norwegian sport shooter. He was born in Aure, and his club was Dromnessund Skytterlag. He competed in military rifle and free rifle at the 1912 Summer Olympics in Stockholm.

References

1886 births
1962 deaths
People from Aure, Norway
Shooters at the 1912 Summer Olympics
Olympic shooters of Norway
Norwegian male sport shooters
Sportspeople from Møre og Romsdal
20th-century Norwegian people